"Dyna-mite" is a 1973 single, written by the songwriting team of Mike Chapman and Nicky Chinn. It was originally written for The Sweet, who rejected it, and later inherited by the English glam rock band Mud. Chapman and Chinn produced the song as well.

Chart performance 
The song was a "catchy rocker" that became a top five hit in the UK Singles Chart reaching number four in October 1973. It topped the charts in the Netherlands in 1974.

Other information 
The single was released on both 7" and vinyl record formats by the RAK music label. The B-side was "Do It All Over Again". In Australia, the single was released by RAK as "DYNAMITE", without the hyphen in the title.

The song is featured in the soundtrack of the 2013 film Rush.

A cover of the song, performed by Matthew Porretta, occurs in the 2019 videogame Control.

Chart positions

Weekly charts

Year-end charts

Certifications

References 

1973 singles
Mud (band) songs
Songs written by Nicky Chinn
Songs written by Mike Chapman
Dutch Top 40 number-one singles
Ultratop 50 Singles (Flanders) number-one singles
Song recordings produced by Mike Chapman